Project Candor or Operation Candor was a public relations campaign run by the administration of Dwight D. Eisenhower. The thought behind the campaign was to inform the U.S. public of the facts as to the armaments race and the government's official analysis of those facts.  The goal the government wanted to achieve from Project Candor was to have an "informed and careful public", which would also still support necessary actions of their government.  The project set up a series of 6-minute nationwide Radio-TV talks that were to be held by administration officials. The talks' introduction and conclusion were to be held by the President. The planning of the campaign began in the spring of 1953.

Background 

The background for Project Candor was that Eisenhower's administration found out of the nuclear weapons capabilities of the Soviet Union. When informed of their massive capabilities, Eisenhower became convinced that the U.S. public had a right to understand the dangers the US confronted in the USSR. This coincided with the January 1953 report of the State Department Panel of Consultants on Disarmament, which recommended that the U.S. government practice less secrecy and more honesty towards the American people about these realities. Eisenhower liked this recommendation of the report and it led directly to Operation Candor being formed.

In addition, Eisenhower needed U.S. public support on the great expenditure going to the government's nuclear arms race against the USSR. These talks would create understanding as to why the U.S. had to spend vast amounts on nuclear armament. Furthermore, by giving enough details regarding the huge arsenal of U.S. atomic weapons, Eisenhower and his administration hoped to deter the government in USSR and to reassure friendly nations of their security. 
Project Candor was planned to be a series of 6-minute, nationwide Radio-TV talks introduced and concluded by the President, entitled: "The Age of Peril" During these talks prominent political figures (for instance Eisenhower himself) and government officials would discuss topics such as: "The nature of Communism", "The threat to the United States" and "Communism at home". There was disagreement within the administration as to both the message and timing of being "candid". Secretary of Treasury George Humphrey stated fear regarding: "telling the American people these grim facts before we[the government] were in a position to state concretely what steps the Government would take in building a defense against atomic attack."  On top of that, an operation called "candid" would imply that the government had been less candid earlier. Eisenhower's response revealed a somewhat idealistic approach to the project by claiming that a free government requires a well-informed public.

Similar projects 
The Atoms for Peace campaign was a part of Project Candor. Whereas Project Candor was more aimed at the U.S. public, the Atoms for Peace program was a global campaign aimed at convincing the world opinion that the U.S. was more interested in peace than in war.

See also
Atomic Energy Act
Atomic Weapons Rewards Act of 1955
EURATOM Cooperation Act of 1958

References

External links
 
 

Presidency of Dwight D. Eisenhower